Bianca Jagger  (born Blanca Pérez-Mora Macías; 2 May 1945) is a Nicaraguan social and human rights advocate and a former actress. Jagger currently serves as a Council of Europe goodwill ambassador, founder and chair of the Bianca Jagger Human Rights Foundation, member of the Executive Director's Leadership Council of Amnesty International USA, and a trustee of the Amazon Charitable Trust.

She was married to Mick Jagger, lead singer of the Rolling Stones, from 1971 until 1978.

Early life 
Jagger was born in Managua, Nicaragua. Her father was a successful import-export merchant and her mother a housewife. They divorced when Bianca was ten and she stayed with her mother, who had to take care of three children on a small income.  At the age of 16, she changed her name from Blanca to Bianca.  She received a scholarship to study political science in France at the Paris Institute of Political Studies. She was also influenced by Gandhi's non-violent success and Eastern philosophy at large. She travelled extensively in India.

Marriage, family and public life
Bianca met Mick Jagger at a party after a Rolling Stones concert in France in September 1970. On 12 May 1971, while she was four months pregnant, the couple married in a Roman Catholic ceremony in Saint-Tropez, France, and she became his first and only wife, legally.  The couple's only child, a daughter named Jade, was born on 21 October 1971, in Paris, France. In May 1978, she filed for divorce on the grounds of his adultery with model Jerry Hall. Bianca later said "My marriage ended on my wedding day."

In addition to her extensive charitable works, Jagger had a public reputation as a jet-setter and party-goer in the 1970s and early 1980s, being closely associated in the public mind with New York City's nightclub Studio 54. She also became known particularly as a friend of pop artist Andy Warhol.

Jagger has dual nationality, as a naturalised British citizen and citizen of Nicaragua.

Jagger has two granddaughters from her daughter Jade, Assisi Lola (born in 1992) and Amba Isis (born in 1996) and a grandson born in 2014.  She became a great-grandmother in 2014 through her granddaughter Assisi.

Jagger caused a minor controversy in May 2012 when she took flash photographs during a performance of Philip Glass' Einstein on the Beach at the Barbican in London.

Epiphany 
In 1981, Jagger was part of a US congressional delegation stationed at a UN refugee camp in Honduras. At one point during her official visit, the entire staff saw about 40 captured refugees marched away at gunpoint towards El Salvador by a death squad. Armed with nothing but cameras to document the raid, Jagger and the delegation trailed the squad along a river towards the Honduran-Salvadoran border. When both groups were within auditory range of each other, Jagger and the staff shouted at the M16 rifle equipped raiders, "You will have to kill us all!" The squad considered the situation, approached the group, relieved them of their cameras, and released the cache of captives. A transformation had thus begun for Jagger. In subsequent interviews, Jagger has recounted this incident as "a turning point in my life."

Activism 

Bianca Jagger founded the Bianca Jagger Human Rights Foundation, which she chairs. She returned to Nicaragua to look for her parents after the 1972 Nicaragua earthquake, which destroyed Managua, the capital, leaving a toll of more than 10,000 deaths and tens of thousands homeless.

In early 1979, Jagger visited Nicaragua with an International Red Cross delegation and was shocked by the brutality and oppression that the Somoza regime carried out there. This persuaded her to commit herself to the issues of justice and human rights.

In the 1980s, she worked to oppose US government intervention in Nicaragua after the Sandinista revolution. She has also opposed the death penalty and defended the rights of women and of indigenous peoples in Latin America, notably the Yanomami tribe in Brazil against the invasion of gold miners. She spoke up for victims of the conflicts in Bosnia and Serbia. Her writings were published in several newspapers (including The New York Times and the Sunday Express). From the late 1970s, she collaborated with many humanitarian organisations including Amnesty International and Human Rights Watch.

She was also a member of the Twentieth Century Task Force to Apprehend War Criminals, and a trustee of the Amazon Charitable Trust. She gave a reading at the start of the memorial service in London's Westminster Cathedral, which was timed to coincide with the funeral in Brazil of Brazilian Jean Charles de Menezes, who was shot eight times on a tube-train after being mistaken for a suicide bomber in London.  In March 2007, she became involved with Sarah Teather and the campaign to close Guantanamo Bay.

In March 2002, Jagger travelled to Afghanistan with a delegation of fourteen women, organised by Global Exchange to support Afghan women's projects. On 16 December 2003, Jagger was nominated Council of Europe Goodwill Ambassador.

From 2007 to 2009, she was chair of the World Future Council. On 7 July 2007, Jagger presented at the German leg of Live Earth in Hamburg. In July 2008, she was a signatory to a petition to the Catholic bishops of England and Wales to allow the wider celebration of the traditional Latin Mass. In January 2009, Jagger addressed some 12,000 people who rallied in Trafalgar Square in protest against an Israeli offensive in the Gaza several days earlier.

She is a "messenger", more accurately termed ambassador, for the environmental organization 350.org.

She has served as IUCN's Global Ambassador for the Bonn Challenge  a global effort to restore 150 million hectares of the world's degraded and deforested lands by 2020.

On 8 October 2010, she spoke at the Association for the Study of Peak Oil and Gas (ASPO) 2010 world conference on moving beyond petroleum and "Crimes against Present and Future Generations".

In June 2012, Jagger, along with the International Union for Conservation of Nature and Airbus launched an online campaign called Plant a Pledge initiative, which aims to restore 150 million hectares of forest around the world by 2020.

On 21 November 2013, Jagger delivered the prestigious 12th annual Longford Lecture titled "Ending Violence Against Women and Girls, and the Culture of Impunity: achieving the missing Millennium Development Goal target", chaired by Jon Snow.

Prior to the 2015 UK general election, she was one of several celebrities who endorsed the parliamentary candidacy of the Green Party's Caroline Lucas.

Awards 
For her international work on behalf of humanitarian causes, Jagger has earned numerous awards, including:
 1983 Honorary Doctorate of Humanities degree from Stonehill College in Massachusetts
 1994 United Nations Earth Day award
 1996 Hispanic Federation of New York City's Humanitarian Award
 1996 Woman of the Year Title from the Boys Town of Italy
 1996 Abolitionist of the Year Award from the National Coalition to Abolish the Death Penalty
 1997 Green Globe Award from the Rainforest Alliance
 1997 Amnesty International USA Media Spotlight Award for Leadership
 1997 Inducted to the Hall of Fame in Miami Children's Hospital Foundation
 1998 American Civil Liberties Union Award
 2000 Champion of Justice Award
 2003 International Award from International Service
 2003 'special recognition' as a Woman of Peace at the Global Exchange Human Rights Awards in San Francisco with Arundhati Roy, Barbara Lee and Kathy Kelly.
 2004 Women's World Award (World Achievement) from Mikhail Gorbachev
 2004 Right Livelihood Award
 2006 World Citizenship Award from The Nuclear Age Peace Foundation
 2006 Office of the Americas Peace and Justice Award
 2008 Honorary Doctorate of Human Rights degree from Simmons College in Massachusetts

Film and television 

Bianca also appeared in several movies and TV shows:
 Cocksucker Blues (1972, documentary about the Rolling Stones' 1972 North American tour)
 Trick or Treat (1975) (unfinished movie)
 Flesh Color (Couleur chair) (1978)
 All You Need Is Cash (1978, as Martini)
 The American Success Company (1979; as Corrine)
 The Cannonball Run (1981, as sheik's sister)
 In Our Hands (1984)
 Miami Vice (1985) TV episode "Free Verse"
 Street Hawk (1985) TV episode "The Unsinkable 453"
 Hotel (1986) TV episode "Separation"
 The Colbys (1987) TV episode "Betrayal"
 After Dark (an extended appearance in 1988 on the British TV programme, discussed here).
 C.H.U.D. II: Bud the C.H.U.D. (1989)
 Last Party 2000 (2001, a documentary film about the 2000 US Presidential election)
 The Fourth Revolution: Energy (2011 German documentary)

Notes

References

External links 
 Right Livelihood Award recipient Bianca Jagger
 
 2003 interview with Logos

1945 births
Living people
People from Managua
Nicaraguan actresses
Humanitarians
Mick Jagger
Nightlife in New York City
Nicaraguan Roman Catholics
North American pacifists
Sustainability advocates
Tibet freedom activists